Anthony Lee Kok Hin (born 20 March 1937) is a Malaysian Roman Catholic prelate.

Ordained to the priesthood in 1966, Lee was named bishop of the Roman Catholic Diocese of Miri, Malaysia on 30 May 1977 and retired on 30 October 2013.

He was succeeded by Bishop Richard Ng.

References

External link

1937 births
Living people
People from Sarawak
20th-century Roman Catholic bishops in Malaysia
21st-century Roman Catholic bishops in Malaysia